Alexander Scriabin's Sonate-Fantaisie in G-sharp minor (or Sonata-Fantaisie) was composed in 1886, when he was fourteen. It was dedicated to Natalya Sekerina, the sweetheart of his adolescence.

A portentous introduction leads to a gentle, idyllic first movement highly reminiscent of Chopin in its flow of melody. The opening Andante gives way to a more agitated sonata movement. The cadence theme, especially on its return where it is accompanied by simple chords rather than flowing accompaniment figures, has a touch of a mazurka about it. The development section, with its broken tenths in the left hand and the polyphony in the treble, is very original in its sonorities. The end introduces a reminiscence of an ensuing idea in the introduction. Its chromaticism is highly characteristic of Scriabin's later works.

It was written during the time when Scriabin was studying under Nikolai Zverev.

External links

Piano Sonata 02
1886 compositions
Scriabin
Compositions in G-sharp minor
Music with dedications